Rupela procula is a moth in the family Crambidae. It was described by Carl Heinrich in 1937. It is found in Santa Catarina in Brazil and in Peru.

The wingspan is 50–51 mm. The wings are white.

References

Moths described in 1937
Schoenobiinae
Taxa named by Carl Heinrich